Cupulomyces is a genus of fungi in the family Laboulbeniaceae. A monotypic genus, Cupulomyces contains the single species Cupulomyces lasiochili.

References

External links
Cupulomyces at Index Fungorum

Laboulbeniaceae
Monotypic Laboulbeniomycetes genera
Laboulbeniales genera